Apalachicola is the name of two United States Navy ships, both named after Apalachicola, Florida;

  is a future 

United States Navy ship names